Acanthops bidens is a species of mantis in the family Acanthopidae.

Discovery 
 This species was described by Morgan Hebard in 1922.

Distribution 
Acanthops bidens is native to Mexico.

References 

Mantodea of North America
Acanthopidae
Insects described in 1922